The Council of Appointment (sometimes also Council of Appointments) was a body of the Government of New York that existed from 1777 to 1822.

History
Under the New York Constitution of 1777, the Council of Appointment consisted of the Governor of New York, who was ex officio president of this council but had only a casting vote, and four members of the New York State Senate, one each from the state's senatorial electoral districts. These state senators were elected for a one-year term by the New York State Assembly and could not be re-elected for the following term.

The Council had the power to appoint all state, county and municipal officials within the state of New York for which no other means of appointment or election was provided for in the State Constitution. The offices filled by the Council included the State Comptroller, the Secretary of State, the Attorney General, the Surveyor General, the Chancellor, the justices of the New York Supreme Court, sheriffs, district attorneys, judges, surrogates, city and county clerks, mayors (including the Mayor of New York City), all military officers and many others.

The Council of Appointment had its origins in the fear of too much popular influence in the government. The first New York Constitution was aristocratic and elitist in spirit. As long as the governor alone nominated appointees, he had as much power over the state's patronage as a medieval king. On the other side, during the long tenure of Governor George Clinton, very rarely an office holder was removed, and the Council only filled vacancies as they occurred by resignation, death, declination of re-appointment, or term limit.

Troubles, however, arose after the Federalist Party and the Democratic-Republican Party appeared, and began to alternate as majority in the Assembly. Because of the lack of clarity in the 1777 New York Constitution, the parties struggled over who, exactly, held the power to make nominations and appointments. The constitution stated that the governor would have the "casting voice, but no other vote; and with the advice and consent of the said council..." The custom arose that the governor made the nominations, and the Council approved, or rejected, them. But when the legislature had a majority of the opposition, they would elect three or four senators and outvote the governor. Governor John Jay, who had drafted the Constitution, asserted that the Council could not propose appointees, only vote for or against the governor's nominees. So when the Council voted down all of his nominees, in his opinion, nobody could be appointed. The question was settled at the New York State Constitutional Convention of 1801, which amended the Constitution, giving the right of nomination to the governor and each one of the Council members concurrently. This led to an annual scramble for office, especially if the majority in the Assembly changed.

Alexander Hamilton criticized the Council in his Federalist No. 77.

The council was abolished by the New York State Constitutional Convention of 1821 and ceased to exist at the end of the year 1822, at which time more than 15,000 offices had been under its control. Under the Constitution of 1821, the State cabinet officers and Supreme Court justices were elected by the State Legislature, and most of the county and local officers were elected in local popular or legislative elections. The governor continued to appoint only a very small number of officers and had the right to make recess appointments.

List of members

Notes

Sources
The New York Civil List compiled by Franklin Benjamin Hough (pages 99f; Weed, Parsons and Co., 1858)
The History of Political Parties in the State of New-York, from the Ratification of the Federal Constitution to 1840 by Jabez D. Hammond (4th ed., Vol. 1, H. & E. Phinney, Cooperstown, 1846)

See also
Council of Revision

Legal history of New York (state)
1777 establishments in New York (state)
1822 disestablishments in the United States
Defunct state agencies of New York (state)